Simon Michael (born June 19, 1992) is a Cypriot professional basketball player for Keravnos of the Cypriot League. Michael entered the 2014 NBA draft but was not selected in the draft's two rounds.

Professional career
Michael began his career with AEL Limassol of the Cypriot League. After a really good year with the club, he joined Keravnos. On May 19, 2019, after already being at the club for 5 years, he extended his contract until 2022.

Cyprus national team
Michael has been a member of the junior national teams of Cyprus for some years. He is currently one of the leaders of the Cyprus national team and also the captain.

References

External links
RealGM.com Profile
Eurobasket.com Profile

1992 births
Living people
Cypriot men's basketball players
Keravnos B.C. players
Point guards